Robert Wielaert (born 29 December 1978) is a Dutch former professional footballer who played as a centre-back.

Club career

Career in the Netherlands (1997–2013)
Wielaert was born in Emmeloord, Flevoland and made his debut in professional football with PSV Eindhoven in the 1997–98 season. He also played for FC Den Bosch and NEC before joining FC Twente. During his FC Twente period he was the captain of the team.

During the 2009 January transfer period he went to Ajax for a transfer fee of 3 million. However, he lost his starting position and was sent on loan to Roda JC at the start of the 2010–11 season. He signed for two seasons with Roda in the summer of 2011. After his contract had expired in 2013, Wielaert was released.

Career with Melbourne Heart / City (2013–2015)
In June 2013, Wielaert was signed by Australian club Melbourne Heart in the A-League. The Dutchman had never played outside of the Netherlands and was optimistic about playing in Australia:

"I have played all of my career in the Netherlands and now it is an exciting time to play abroad. So when Melbourne Heart contacted me, I was enthusiastic immediately. The club sounds great, the city and the country too, so I am looking forward to giving everything for this club and the people around it."

Wielaert scored his first goal for his new club and was the opening goal in the Melbourne Derby against Melbourne Victory on 25 October 2014 in front of 43,729 fans. City went on to lose the match 5–2.

On 13 April 2015, Wielaert was released by the club.

Coaching

Box Hill United
Upon retiring, Wielaert commenced his coaching education, and as of 2018 is assistant coach at Box Hill United, whilst studying for his B-License.

Career statistics

References

1978 births
Living people
People from Emmeloord
Dutch footballers
Association football defenders
PSV Eindhoven players
FC Den Bosch players
NEC Nijmegen players
FC Twente players
AFC Ajax players
Roda JC Kerkrade players
Eredivisie players
Eerste Divisie players
A-League Men players
Melbourne City FC players
Dutch expatriate footballers
Dutch expatriate sportspeople in Australia
Expatriate soccer players in Australia
Footballers from Noordoostpolder